Kendua is an upazila of Netrokona District in the Division of Mymensingh, Bangladesh.

Geography

It has 51221 households and total area 303.6 km2. The upazila is bounded by Netrokona sadar and Atpara upazilas on the north, Nandail and Tarail upazilas on the south, Madan upazila on the east, Nandail, Ishwarganj and Gauripur upazilas on the west.

Demographics
According to 2011 Bangladesh census, Kendua had a population of 304,729. Males constituted 49.24% of the population and females 50.76%. Muslims formed 96.16% of the population, Hindus 3.72% and others 0.13%. Kendua had a literacy rate of 37.58% for the population 7 years and above.

As of the 1991 Bangladesh census, Kendua had a population of 265628. Males constituted 50.58% of the population, and females 49.42%. This Upazila's eighteen up population was 133969. Kendua had an average literacy rate of 37.1% (7+ years), and the national average of 32.4% literate.

Administration
Kendua Thana was formed 1890 and it was turned into an upazila in 1983.

Kendua Upazila is divided into Kendua Municipality and 13 union parishads: Asujia, Balaishimul, Chirang, Dalpa, Garadoba, Gamda, Kandiura, Mashka, Muzaffarpur, Noapara, Paikura, Roailbari, and Sandikona. The union parishads are subdivided into 217 mauzas and 289 villages.

Kendua Municipality is subdivided into 9 wards and 32 mahallas.

Notable people
Raushan Yazdani, author and folklorist
Chandra Kumar De, folklorist and writer
 Hadis Uddin Chowdhury, Member of Gonoporishod (1970), organizer of freedom fighters in kendua upazila
 Humayun Ahmed, Famous Bengali Novelist and film director.

See also
Upazilas of Bangladesh
Districts of Bangladesh
Divisions of Bangladesh

References

Upazilas of Netrokona District